The 1995 New York City Marathon was the 26th running of the annual marathon race in New York City, United States, which took place on Sunday, November 12. The men's elite race was won by Mexico's Germán Silva in a time of 2:11:00 hours while the women's race was won by Kenya's Tegla Loroupe in 2:28:06.
      
A total of 26,754 runners finished the race, 20,284 men and 6470 women.

Results

Men

Women

References

Results
Results. Association of Road Racing Statisticians. Retrieved 2020-05-23.

External links
New York Road Runners website

1995
New York City
Marathon
New York City Marathon